Mount Breckinridge is a mountain,  high, standing  south of Stor Hånakken Mountain in the Napier Mountains of Enderby Land, Antarctica.  It was mapped by Norwegian cartographers from aerial photos taken by the Lars Christensen Expedition of 1936–37, and was named "Langnuten" (the long peak).  It was rephotographed by the Australian National Antarctic Research Expeditions in 1956 and renamed by the Antarctic Names Committee of Australia for J.E. Breckinridge a meteorologist at Wilkes Station in 1961.

See also
 List of mountains of Enderby Land

References

External links
 Scientific Committee on Antarctic Research (SCAR)
 Composite Gazetteer of Antarctica

Mountains of Enderby Land